Club Deportivo Cobeña was a Spanish football team based in Cobeña, a small suburb of Madrid. 

Founded in 1998, it last played in Segunda División B - Group 1 in 2006–07, holding home matches at Municipal La Dehesa (The meadow) municipal stadium, with a 2,000 seat capacity.

History
Founded in 1998, Cobeña started competing in national categories six years later. On 7 September 2007, the team disappeared due to financial problems, just one year after achieving an historical Segunda División B promotion.

Season to season

1 season in Segunda División B
2 seasons in Tercera División

Famous players
  Jerry Kamgang
 Mutiu Adepoju
 Antonio Acosta
 Luis Miguel Ramis
  Sebastián Flores
 Santiago Hondo

Notable coaches
 Alfredo Santaelena

References

External links
Official website 

Association football clubs established in 1998
Association football clubs disestablished in 2007
Defunct football clubs in the Community of Madrid
1998 establishments in Spain
2007 disestablishments in Spain